Ngaihak Lambida (English: Along The Way) is a 2006 non-feature Indian Meitei language film directed by Haobam Paban Kumar. It is produced by Satyajit Ray Film and Television Institute. The film was selected in the non-feature section of the Indian Panorama at the 38th International Film Festival of India 2007.

The film participated in the competition section of Short Fiction Films in the Third Eye 6th Asian Film Festival, Mumbai, 2007.

Cast
 Huirem Seema as Manileima
 Kangabam Tomba as Stranger
 Tarkovsky Haobam as Bungo
 R.K. Surchandra as Geet

References

2006 films
Meitei-language films